Viva Hate is the debut solo studio album by English singer Morrissey. It was released on 14 March 1988 by HMV, six months after the final studio album by the Smiths, Strangeways, Here We Come (1987).

Vini Reilly, the leader of the English post-punk band the Durutti Column, played guitar on the album. Producer Stephen Street, who had contributed to multiple Smiths releases, served as the bassist.

Background
Viva Hate was recorded between October and December 1987. Although all songwriting is credited to Morrissey and producer Stephen Street, the Durutti Column's guitarist Vini Reilly, who had been drafted into the sessions by Street, later claimed every song on the album except "Suedehead" had been composed by Morrissey and Reilly. Street has denied this. In an interview in 2014 Vini Reilly said "I want to talk about Stephen Street about whom I've said wrong things in the past; this is not an excuse, this is fact, I have suffered from what they call 'displaced anger' and this is where you're very angry with yourself and you don't understand, you just shout at people you really care about."

Release
Viva Hate was released on 14 March 1988 by record label HMV.

EMI Australia considered Viva Hate too harsh a title and renamed the album Education in Reverse for LP release in Australia and New Zealand, the same title appearing as an etching on the vinyl.

The American release included the track "Hairdresser on Fire", which had been released in the UK as a B-side to "Suedehead", as track 9. This same track was released on a 7" single that was sold with the album in Japan.

The track "Margaret on the Guillotine", which described the death of then-prime minister Margaret Thatcher as a "wonderful dream", led to Morrissey briefly being questioned by the Special Branch.

It was certified Gold by the RIAA on 16 November 1993.

In 1997, EMI, in celebration of their 100th anniversary, released a remastered special edition of this album in the UK. It features different cover art and a different booklet (it has a photograph of a billboard for the 1993 live album Beethoven Was Deaf and drops the lyrics) as well as eight bonus tracks – only one of which was contemporaneous with the album. "Hairdresser on Fire" does not appear on this version.

A newly remastered, special edition of Viva Hate, supervised by Stephen Street, was released on 2 April 2012. This edition controversially omits, along with the name of Vini Reilly, one of the original album's tracks, "The Ordinary Boys", and includes the session outtake "Treat Me Like a Human Being". Also, the extended fadeout of "Late Night, Maudlin Street" has been changed. Stephen Street has said that he felt these changes were a mistake but that the track selection was changed at Morrissey's insistence. "Hairdresser on Fire", again, is also not included on this edition. Additionally, the typeface font on the front cover had been changed.

Critical reception

Viva Hate was generally well received by music critics. Rolling Stone called the album "a tight, fairly disciplined affair", in comparison of its sound to that of the Smiths. In its retrospective review, Pitchfork called the album "one of Morrissey's most interesting records, and certainly his riskiest", and that its "strange mix of pomp and minimal languor makes Viva Hate the only Morrissey LP you'd consider listening to just for its music".

A negative review came from Spin, who wrote "without guitarist/composer Johnny Marr at his side, the mahatma of mope rock seems to have gone out for a nice depressing stroll without noticing that he didn't have a stitch to wear".

Viva Hate was listed by Q as one of the top 50 albums of 1988. The album was also included in the book 1001 Albums You Must Hear Before You Die (2005).

Track listing

Personnel
Credits are adapted from the Viva Hate liner notes.

 Morrissey – vocals, lyricist, sleeve art
 Stephen Street – bass guitar, guitar, songwriter, producer
 Vini Reilly – guitars, keyboards
 Andrew Paresi – drums
 Richard Koster – violin
 Fenella Barton – violin
 Rachel Maguire – cello
 Mark Davies – cello
 Robert Woolhard – cello
 John Metcalf – viola
 Steve Williams – assistant engineer
 Anton Corbijn – photography
 Linder Sterling – photography
 Eamon Macabe – photography
 Jo Slee – art coordinator
 Caryn Gough – layout assistance

Charts

Certifications

References

External links
 

Morrissey albums
1988 debut albums
Albums produced by Stephen Street
Sire Records albums
Reprise Records albums
His Master's Voice albums
Liberty Records albums